Alfons Bouwens was a Belgian boxer. He competed in the men's bantamweight event at the 1920 Summer Olympics. At the 1920 Summer Olympics, he lost to Clarence Walker of South Africa.

References

Year of birth missing
Year of death missing
Belgian male boxers
Olympic boxers of Belgium
Boxers at the 1920 Summer Olympics
Place of birth missing
Bantamweight boxers